The men's 110 metres hurdles competition of the athletics events at the 2019 Pan American Games will take place between the 9 and 10 of August at the 2019 Pan American Games Athletics Stadium. The defending Pan American Games champion is David Oliver from the United States.

Summary
Out of the blocks, Greggmar Swift was the first over the first hurdle with Jarret Eaton in lane 9 on the far outside a close second hitting his first.  Swift and Eaton were almost stride for stride through 3 hurdles, though Eaton had flattened all of his hurdles and Gabriel Constantino, next to Swift sped into contention.  At the fifth hurdle, Eaton hit it square with his foot, riding it down off balance and Swift was also slightly off balance, drifting to his left going into five, giving Constantino the lead.  Eaton sidestepped six, taking himself off the track and the faster moving Constantino had a clear lead.  Shane Brathwaite and Freddie Crittenden were pulling even with Swift.  At the seventh everything changed, Constantino looks like he came up too close to the hurdle and tried to quick step it.  He failed miserably crashing to the ground.  Brathwaite and Crittenden found themselves in a neck and neck battle for the lead as Swift struggled.  Dodging Constantino as he fell into his lane, Crittenden seized a slight advantage over 9 and 10, but Brathwaite was faster on the run in to take the narrow win.  Eduardo Rodrigue caught Swift at the 9th hurdle and continued in for bronze.  The final two finishers Roger Iribarne and Fanor Escobar were both judged to have cleared their barriers improperly and were disqualified.

Records
Prior to this competition, the existing world and Pan American Games records were as follows:

Schedule

Results
All times shown are in seconds.

Semifinal
The heats took place on 9 August at 15:30. The results were as follows:
Qualification: First 3 in each heat (Q) and the next 2 fastest (q) advance to the Final

Final
The final took place on 10 August at 14:40. The results were as follows:
Wind: +1.8 m/s

References

Athletics at the 2019 Pan American Games
2019